FC Namys Almaty (Namys fýtbol klýby)  are a Kazakhstani football club based in Almaty, Kazakhstan. The club played in the Kazakhstan Super League in season 1993. They were members of the Kazakhstan First Division from 1994.

Name history
1992 : Founded as Namys Almaty based in Almaty.

References

Football clubs in Almaty
Football clubs in Kazakhstan
1992 establishments in Kazakhstan